Get Rollin is a 1980 American roller disco documentary film directed by J. Terrance Mitchell.

Reception 
Vincent Canby from The New York Times praised the film's engagement, and described the film's form, which involved numerous interviews with skating personalities, as "deceptively simple". The review also complimented the starring cast, and concluded that the film was "so full of genuine good feelings that one comes out of theater in a state of something like pure, wonderful elation." Indiewire similarly commented that the two starring skaters were "bright, funny, colorful, and above all inspiring" but criticised the overall structure as loose and that several scenes were "very painfully and obviously staged". Upon its release, the film also did not screen extensively. Roger Angell from The New Yorker called the documentary "noisy and imperfect". The reviewer complimented some of the reportorial scenes, but criticised the film's long length and poor plot.

References

External links

American documentary films
1980 films
Roller skating films
1980s English-language films
1980s American films